Benjamin Bonzi was the defending champion but chose not to defend his title.

Mattia Bellucci won the title after defeating Matteo Arnaldi 6–3, 6–3 in the final.

Seeds

Draw

Finals

Top half

Bottom half

References

External links
Main draw
Qualifying draw

Saint-Tropez Open - 1